Ramchandra Sahani is a member of the Bharatiya Janata Party, Bihar. He won the Bihar Legislative Assembly election in 2005, 2010 and 2015 from Sugauli.

References

Living people
People from East Champaran district
Bharatiya Janata Party politicians from Bihar
Bihar MLAs 2005–2010
Bihar MLAs 2010–2015
Bihar MLAs 2015–2020
Year of birth missing (living people)
Bihar MLAs 2020–2025